George Michael Tansing (25 March 1884 – 4 April 1962) was  a former Australian rules footballer who played with Geelong in the Victorian Football League (VFL).

The son of Chinese immigrant Sang Sing and Ada Mary Stephens, he was born with the name Kimjue Sing in Geelong in 1884. He adopted the anglicized name George Michael Tan Sing (or Tansing) later in life. He made five appearances for Geelong in 1908, scoring a goal in his first and last games for the team.

Notes

External links 
		

1884 births
1962 deaths
Australian rules footballers from Victoria (Australia)
Geelong Football Club players
East Geelong Football Club players
Australian people of Chinese descent